L. S. Sheshagiri Rao (Kannada:ಎಲ್. ಎಸ್. ಶೇಷಗಿರಿ ರಾವ್; 16 February 1925 – 20 December 2019), often referred to as LSS, was an Indian writer and academic specializing in Kannada literature. He wrote an English-Kannada dictionary that is a standard reference text for students. Rao worked for government colleges before gaining a position at Bangalore University's English department. He was the first president of the Kannada Book Trust.

Rao won the Kendra Sahitya Academy Award for his work English Sahitya Charitre. Rao was elected president of the 74th Kannada Sahitya Sammelana. Rao has also won the  Rajyotsava Award, Masti Award, and the Karnataka Sahitya Academy Award for his work.

He died on 20 December 2019 in Bengaluru, aged 94.

References 

1925 births
Kannada-language writers
2019 deaths
Academic staff of Bangalore University
People from Bangalore
Recipients of the Sahitya Akademi Award in Kannada